Luticola doliiformis is a species of non-marine diatom first found in lakes of James Ross Island.

References

Further reading
Kopalová, Kateřina, et al. "Benthic diatoms (Bacillariophyta) from seepages and streams on James Ross Island (NW Weddell Sea, Antarctica)." Plant Ecology and Evolution 145.2 (2012): 190-208. 
Kopalová, Kateřina. "The freshwater diatom flora from Ulu Peninsula (James Ross Island, NW Weddel Sea, Antarctica)." Diatomededelingen 36: 33.

External links
AlgaeBase

Naviculales